The Starke Round Barn near Red Cloud, Nebraska, United States, is a round barn that was built in 1902.  It was listed on the National Register of Historic Places in 1972.

The barn has been restored and now holds special events throughout the year.

References

External links

 Starke Round Barn Historic Site - official site

Barns on the National Register of Historic Places in Nebraska
Infrastructure completed in 1902
Buildings and structures in Webster County, Nebraska
Round barns in Nebraska
Tourist attractions in Webster County, Nebraska
National Register of Historic Places in Webster County, Nebraska